Ahmad Fadhel Mohammed Al-Nuaimi (born 1 January 1992), is an Iraqi footballer who last played as a midfielder for Al-Zawraa in Iraqi Premier League.

International debut
On 26 March 2013 Fadhel made his full international debut against Syria in a friendly match in Al-Shaab Stadium, in Baghdad. The match was ended 2-1 victory for Iraq.

Honors

Clubs
Al-Shorta
Iraqi Premier League: 2012–13
Al-Zawraa
Iraqi Premier League: 2017–18
Iraq FA Cup: 2016–17, 2018–19
Iraqi Super Cup: 2017, 2021

References

External links
Profile on Goalzz

1992 births
Living people
Association football midfielders
Iraqi footballers
Al-Shorta SC players
Iraq international footballers